Yunlu (28 July 1695 – 20 March 1767), born Yinlu, was a Manchu prince of the Qing dynasty. He was born in the Aisin Gioro clan as the 16th son of the Kangxi Emperor. His mother was Consort Mi (密妃), a Han Chinese with the family name Wang. He was good in mathematics and musical tuning. When Boguoduo (博果鐸), the 2nd Prince Zhuang of the First Rank, died in 1723 without an heir. Yunlu was adopted as his heir and inherited his peerage. Yunlu was trusted by Yongzheng Emperor. In 1723, the emperor became seriously ill, Yunlu was appointed as one of regents together with Yunli, Ortai and Zhang Tingyu to assist the new emperor. However, when Hongxi (弘晳), the 2nd Prince Li of the First Rank, was found guilty of rebellion in 1739. Yunlu was implicated in the case and stripped of official position. He returned to politics and managed the Department of Sacrificial Rite Music (神樂署) in 1742, but was no longer trusted by Qianlong Emperor. He died in 1767, and was granted the posthumous name "Ke" (恪, respectful). His princely title was inherited by his eldest grandson, Yongchang (永瑺).

Family 
Primary Consort

 Imperial Princess Consort Zhuangke, of the Gorolo clan (莊恪亲王妃 郭絡羅氏)Titles: Primary Consort of the Sixteenth Prince (十六王子福晋) → Princess Consort Zhuang of the First Rank (莊亲王妃) → Imperial Princess Consort Zhuangke of the First Rank (莊恪亲王妃)
 First son (4 September 1712)
 Princess Duanrou of the Second Rank (和碩端柔公主; 13 April 1714 – 23 January 1755), first daughter
 Married Chimed Dorji (齊默特多爾濟; d. 1782) of the Khorchin Borjigit clan in January/February 1731
 Third son (5 October 1715 – 16 October 1715)
 Hongshen (弘慎; 5 March 1717 – 27 July 1719), fifth son
 Second daughter (20 December 1720 – May/June 1721)
 Princess of the Third Rank (郡主; 20 March 1723 – 29 May 1752), fourth daughter
 Married Laxinamuzha'er (喇錫那木扎爾) of the Khorchin Borjigit clan in January/February 1743

Secondary Consort

 Secondary consort, of the Li clan (側福晉 李氏)
 Hongpu, Prince Zhuang of the First Rank (莊親王 弘普; 9 August 1713 – 16 April 1743), second son
 Honghao (弘皓; 7 February 1717 – 3 September 1718), fourth son
 Hongming, General of the Second Rank (輔國將軍 弘明; 14 May 1719 – 10 June 1787), sixth son

 Secondary consort, of the Zhu clan (側福晉 朱氏)
 Seventh son (15 November 1727 – 5 November 1728)

 Secondary consort, of the Xue clan (側福晉 薛氏)
 Princess of the Fourth Rank (縣主; 24 November 1727 – 25 June 1790), sixth daughter
 Married Tsewang Norbu (色旺諾爾布) of the Khorchin Borjigit clan in December 1739
 Seventh daughter (23 May 1730 – 20 February 1749)

 Secondary consort, of the Wang clan (側福晉 王氏)
 Princess of the Fourth Rank (縣主; 18 June 1733 – March/April 1802), eighth daughter
 Married Luobocangduo'erji (羅蔔藏多爾濟) in November/December 1750
 Princess of the Fourth Rank (縣主; 20 August 1734 – 3 November 1754), ninth daughter
 Married Yuanlao (元勞) of the Manchu Tunggiya clan in April/May 1752

 Secondary consort, of the Zhang clan (側福晉 張氏)
 Hongrong, Duke of the Second Rank (輔國公 弘曧; 4 August 1737 – 22 November 1806), eighth son
 Hong'ai (弘曖; 3 March 1739 – 2 July 1744), ninth son

 Secondary consort, of the Hu clan (側福晉 胡氏)
 Hongchen (弘晨; 3 June 1742 – 6 May 1743), tenth son

Concubine

 Mistress, of the Fuca clan (富察氏)
 Third daughter (21 December 1721 – December 1722 or January 1723)

 Mistress, of the Wang clan (王氏)
 Lady of the Third Rank (鄉君; 1 May 1725 – 11 April 1794), fifth daughter
 Married Exin (鄂欣 ) of the Manchu Sirin Gioro (西林覺羅) clan in March/April 1742

Ancestry

See also
 Prince Zhuang
 Royal and noble ranks of the Qing dynasty
 Ranks of imperial consorts in China#Qing

References

 
 

Qing dynasty politicians
1695 births
1767 deaths
Manchu politicians
Kangxi Emperor's sons
Qing dynasty politicians from Beijing
Qing dynasty imperial princes
Prince Zhuang